Michael Levin (February 17, 1984, Holland, Pennsylvania, United States – August 1, 2006, Ayta ash Shab, Lebanon) was an American-Israeli soldier in the Paratroopers Brigade of the Israel Defense Forces (IDF) who was killed in action in the Second Lebanon War, during the first round of fighting in the Lebanese town of Ayta ash Shab. He was 22 years old. His death had a major impact in Israel—thousands attended his funeral—and inspired the creation of a support organization for other IDF soldiers from abroad. A memorial to him was built in Jerusalem.

Early life 
Levin was raised in Bucks County, Pennsylvania, and attended Gratz College before moving to Israel shortly after he turned 18 years of age. Michael's maternal grandparents were Holocaust survivors and had a great impact on his Jewish identity.

Omer Yaniv, from Levin's paratrooper unit, gave a graphic description of the chaotic circumstances surrounding his death. The 890th Paratrooper Battalion came under heavy fire as they advanced into the town. The IDF soldiers could not identify the source of the fire. The battalion's units got separated when running away. Levin's platoon hid in the back room of an empty store. A Hezbollah fighter managed to get close and fire straight into the small room, hitting Levin in the head. After several hours reinforcements reached the building and extracted them.

Levin was one of three IDF soldiers killed in Ayta ash Shab that day. Another 27 on the Israeli side were wounded. For several hours the Israeli soldiers fought and killed 15 Hezbollah fighters, according to IDF figures. The IDF's wounded were treated at the spot under heavy fire, as an evacuation was deemed almost impossible. A local commander of Hezbollah guided Al Jazeera through Ayta ash Shab after the war and showed them the store where Levin was killed.

A memorial for Levin was erected at Ammunition Hill, Jerusalem, the site of a major battle during the Six-Day War of 1967. The Lone Soldier Center in Memory of Michael Levin was created in 2009 by a group of people who had served as "lone soldiers" in the IDF. The center operates from branches in Jerusalem, Tel Aviv, and Haifa. It provides services to lone soldiers such as help finding housing, counseling, and organized meals on Jewish holidays and the Jewish Sabbath.

On August 1, 2011, the 5th anniversary ("yarzheit") of Levin's death according to the Gregorian calendar, a flag was flown over the US Capitol in his memory at the request of a man from his local area, Johnson Reynolds, who considered him both an Israeli and American hero. Upon receiving the flag from the architect of the Capitol, Reynolds, at the invitation of an IDF battalion commander, traveled with several friends to Israel and on September 21, 2011, accompanied by a member of the IDF, flew that flag over Levin's resting place at Mt. Herzl. On June 27, 2012 they presented the flag to Levin's parents, Mark and Harriet Levin, in a case with the assistance of Consul General Daniel Kutner of the Israeli consulate of Philadelphia.

References

 U.S. Family Lays 'Lone Soldier' Son to Rest in Israel
 ynetnews - News - sorry page

External links
 The Lone Soldier Center – In Memory of Michael Levin
 Remembering Michael Levin

1984 births
2006 deaths
2006 Lebanon War
American emigrants to Israel
American military personnel killed in action
Burials at Mount Herzl
Gratz College
Israeli military personnel killed in action
People from Bucks County, Pennsylvania